William Preston Moss (Jackson, Tennessee, April 26, 1897 – Jackson, Tennessee, December 25, 1985) was an American lawyer and politician. He was a member of the Tennessee State Senate from 1933 to 1937, serving as Speaker of the Senate in the 1936-7 session.

Early life
Moss' parents were William Mortimer Moss (1839–1929) and Mary Peyton (Randolph) Moss (1861–1933). After serving in the army in World War I as a corporal, he attended Vanderbilt University in Nashville, Tennessee and graduated with a BA and LLB in 1921. He immediately set up a law practice in Jackson.

Career
Moss served as the Jackson city attorney from 1925 to 1943. A Democrat, he was elected to two terms in the Tennessee State Senate, serving from 1933 to 1937, and was elected speaker for the 1936-7 session. (In Tennessee, the speaker of the senate is second in line for the governorship, similar to the lieutenant governor in other states.) In 1937-8 he served as a special judge on the Court of Appeals. From 1943-5 he was the president of the Jackson-Madison Bar Association. In 1953 he served as a member of a constitutional convention to revise the constitution. Moss was the chairman of the Tennessee Bar Association 1960-1. In 1963 he was appointed to the newly constituted Law Revision Commission.

Personal life
Moss married Lutitia Saxon Myers (1914–1995) on June 29, 1935; they had 4 children, William Preston Moss, Jr. (1936–1997), Michael Durham Moss (1938– ), John Ramsey Moss (1941–2011), Mary Lutitia Pettigrew (19??– ).

References

1897 births
1985 deaths
People from Jackson, Tennessee
Tennessee lawyers
Democratic Party Tennessee state senators
Vanderbilt University alumni
20th-century American politicians
20th-century American lawyers